Collège Français de Santa Cruz de la Sierra is a French international school in Santa Cruz de la Sierra, Bolivia. The school includes levels maternelle (preschool) through lycée (senior high school).

The first classes began in 2005 in a house in the Las Palmas neighborhood in January 2005.

References

External links
  Collège Français de Santa Cruz de la Sierra
  Collège Français de Santa Cruz de la Sierra (old website)

International schools in Santa Cruz de la Sierra
Santa Cruz
Educational institutions established in 2005
2005 establishments in Bolivia